Cross Creek Pictures is an American film production studio formed in 2009 by Timmy Thompson and Tyler Thompson . Its first production was the acclaimed Black Swan (2010), which was followed by The Ides of March (2011), The Woman in Black (2012) and Rush (2013). In September 2011, Cross Creek Pictures signed a deal with Universal Pictures, where the studio would release at least six of Cross Creek's productions over the following three years. In late 2015, Cross Creek signed a new three-year, multifaceted co-financing, production, and distribution deal with Sony Pictures.

Films
This is the list of films produced or financed by Cross Creek.

References

External links
Official website

Film production companies of the United States
Entertainment companies established in 2009
Entertainment companies based in California
Companies based in Los Angeles